Hordeum brevisubulatum is a widespread species of wild barley native to temperate and subarctic Eastern Europe and Asia. A halophyte, it prefers to grow in saline grasslands.

References

brevisubulatum
Plants described in 1844